Orazio Annibale della Molara or Horatio Annibaldi della Molara (1585–1643) was a Roman Catholic prelate who served as Bishop of Manfredonia (1630–1643).

Biography
Orazio Annibale della Molara was born on 10 Oct 1585 in Rome, Italy and ordained a deacon on 22 Feb 1611.
On 18 Feb 1630, he was appointed during the papacy of Pope Urban VIII as Bishop of Manfredonia.
On 19 Mar 1630, he was consecrated bishop by Luigi Caetani, Cardinal-Priest of Santa Pudenziana. 
He served as Bishop of Manfredonia until his death on 7 May 1643.

References

External links and additional sources
 (for Chronology of Bishops) 
 (for Chronology of Bishops)  

17th-century Italian Roman Catholic bishops
Bishops appointed by Pope Urban VIII
1585 births
1643 deaths